The Spirit of Notre Dame is a 1931 American drama film directed by Russell Mack, written by Walter DeLeon, Robert Keith, Richard Schayer and Dale Van Every, and starring Lew Ayres, Sally Blane, William Bakewell, Andy Devine, Harry Barris and J. Farrell MacDonald. It was released on October 13, 1931, by Universal Pictures.

Plot

Cast
Lew Ayres as Bucky O'Brien
Sally Blane as Peggy
William Bakewell as Jim Stewart
Andy Devine as Truck McCall 
Harry Barris as Wasp
J. Farrell MacDonald as Coach
Frank Carideo as himself
Don Miller, Elmer Layden, Jim Crowley, and Harry Stuhldreher as the Four Horsemen
Nat Pendleton as assistant coach
Adam Walsh as himself
Bucky O'Connor as himself
John Law as himself
Moon Mullins as himself
Art McManmon as himself
Al Howard as himself
John B. O'Brien as himself

References

External links 
 

1931 films
1931 drama films
American black-and-white films
American drama films
American football films
Films directed by Russell Mack
Films set in universities and colleges
Notre Dame Fighting Irish football
Universal Pictures films
1930s English-language films
1930s American films
Films with screenplays by Richard Schayer